Edwina Grima (born November 1969) is a Maltese judge.

See also
 Judiciary of Malta

References

Living people
21st-century Maltese judges
Maltese women
1969 births
21st-century women judges